Play to Win may refer to:

Books
I Play to Win, posthumous book by Freddie Steinmark 1971

Film and TV
Play to Win, episode of Survivor (TV series) 2015
Play to Win, syndicated show hosted by Bob Neal (Atlanta sportscaster)

Music
Play to Win (musical)

Albums
Play to Win (Gabrielle album) 2004
Play to Win: The Very Best of Heaven 17, compilation album by Heaven 17 2012

Songs
"Play To Win", charting single by Heaven 17, written B. E. F., Gregory 1981
"Play to Win", song by	The Clash, composed by Joe Strummer Cut the Crap 1985
"Play to Win", song by Al Green, composed by Al Green / Willie Mitchell  I Can't Stop 2003	
"Play to Win", song by	Gabrielle from Play to Win (Gabrielle album) 2004
"Play to Win", song by	Seamus Haji / K3 (band) Composed by M. Edwards / Alice Lascelles Composed by Steve McGuinness
"Play to Win", song by	Jimmy Thackery and the Drivers, composed by Jimmy Thackery
"Play to Win", song by	Hinder, composed by Hinder Play to Win 2017